Murison is a surname. Notable people with the surname include:

Alexander Murison (1847–1934), Scottish academic
George Murison (1819–1889), Canadian mayor
James Murison (1816–1885), South African politician
Krissi Murison (born 1981), British music journalist
William Murison (1837–1877), New Zealand politician and cricketer

See also
Ian William Murison Smith (1937—2016), Professor of Chemistry at the University of Birmingham

Murrison